Matthew Irmas is an American director and producer.

Filmography

As actor
King of the Underground (2011, as Donald)

As director
When the Party's Over (1993, also producer)
Edie & Pen (1996, also producer)
Sleep Easy, Hutch Rimes (1996, also producer)
A Carol Christmas (2003)

As producer only
Three of Hearts (1993)

References

External links
 

Living people
American film directors
American film producers
Year of birth missing (living people)
Place of birth missing (living people)